South Korean boy band NCT 127 have released five studio albums, four reissues, three live albums, seven extended plays, and nineteen singles. The group debuted in 2016 with their eponymous extended play and its lead single "Fire Truck" as a sub-unit of NCT. It was followed by two extended plays, Limitless and Cherry Bomb, released in 2017. Each spawned one single: "Limitless" and "Cherry Bomb". The following year, the group recorded a single, "Touch", for NCT's first studio album as a complete group, titled NCT 2018 Empathy. In May 2018, they debuted their first Japanese-language extended play, Chain. Its lead single of the name was their first song to chart on the Billboard Japan Hot 100. In October 2018, they released their first studio album, Regular-Irregular, and its lead single of the same name. The album was their first release to appear on the Billboard 200, charting at number 86. Regular-Irregular was followed shortly afterwards by the album's reissue, Regulate, and its lead single "Simon Says". That same year, they released a digital-exclusive Up Next extended play for Apple Music.

In April 2019, they released their first Japanese-language studio album, Awaken, preceded by two singles, "Wakey-Wakey" and the Japanese version of "Touch". The group's fourth Korean extended play, We Are Superhuman released in May 2019 alongside its lead single "Superhuman". Preceded by the single "Dreams Come True", their second Korean-language studio album Neo Zone was released in March 2020 alongside a second single, "Kick It". Combined with its reissue, Neo Zone: The Final Round, it became their first album to sell one million copies. The reissue spawned a third single, "Punch", which became their first to reach the top-10 of the Circle Digital Chart. In 2021, they released their second Japanese-language extended play Loveholic, which was their first release to chart atop the Oricon Albums Chart. It was supported by a first pre-release single, "First Love", and a lead single "Gimme Gimme".

Their third Korean-language studio album, Sticker, was their first album to be certified 2× Million by the Korea Music Content Association (KMCA). It was released in September 2021 alongside its lead single of the same name, which became their first single to chart on the Billboard Global 200. The album was reissued under the name Favorite and a second single, "Favorite (Vampire)", was released. NCT 127 released their fourth Korean-language studio album, 2 Baddies, in September 2022 alongside its lead single of the same name. It was followed by its reissue, Ay-Yo, in January 2023. The single "Ay-Yo" debuted at number one, becoming the group's first single to top the Circle Digital Chart.

Albums

Studio albums

Reissues

Live albums

Extended plays

Singles

Promotional singles

Soundtrack appearances

Collaborations

As featured artist

Other charted songs

Notes

References 

Discography
Discographies of South Korean artists
K-pop music group discographies